is a puzzle video game developed by Natsume and published by Jaleco for arcades in 1996, and ported to the Game Boy, Sega Saturn, and PlayStation later that year. The game would be followed by a sequel, Tetris Plus 2, in 1997. Ports were to be developed for the Atari Jaguar and Nintendo 64 but these were never released.

Gameplay

The game consists of two main modes, Classic Mode and Puzzle Mode. Classic Mode is a standard Tetris game. Puzzle Mode is a mission-based mode where the player must clear a pre-arranged puzzle layout in a limited time. Also included is an editor for making Puzzle Mode levels, and  capability for competitive multiplayer in either game mode. The console versions also have a two-player Versus Mode, which is essentially puzzle mode with two players racing for the finish line.

Puzzle Mode
The biggest addition to Tetris Plus is the Puzzle Mode. The player starts with the first zone, the Egypt; later there are in order: Angkor Wat, Maya and Knossos. The final area, Atlantis, is unlocked by successfully completing the other four stages. Each of the four locations has a different level set. Once the game starts, the player is presented with a cluster of pre-placed bricks, and a professor character who enters the play-area through a disappearing gate. The objective is to get the professor to fall to the bottom, by placing blocks and clearing lines, before the spiked ceiling at the top comes down and crushes him. Two blocks wide and tall, he will aimlessly walk forward until he bumps into a block, after which he turns around and walks the other way. If he comes across a gap that is large enough for him to fit through, he will fall down onto the blocks below him. Conversely, if blocks are placed on top of him, he will climb up them until he reaches the top. But if he is unable to move, he will fall asleep until either a block comes down onto him or the ceiling reaches his current position. If these blocks lead too closely to the spikes, the professor will die.

Upon starting the level, the spiked ceiling will start at the top of the play area. About once every eighteen seconds, it will move down one row, slowly taking away workable space. The player is able to make the ceiling go back up, however, if they can clear three or four rows at once. The ceiling will also destroy any placed blocks that are in its way. This can be used to remove any unwanted pieces until the piece the player wants appears.

Release
The game was published in 1996 in the United States by Jaleco, shortly after the company signed an agreement with Blue Planet Software giving Jaleco exclusive rights to publish Tetris games for the Saturn and PlayStation in the United States for the following two years. The PlayStation version sold well enough to be re-released for the Greatest Hits budget range.

Reception

In Japan, Game Machine listed Tetris Plus on their February 1, 1996, issue as being the sixth most-successful arcade game of the month.

Critical response to the Sega Saturn version was generally unenthusiastic. GameSpot editor Peter Criscuola referred to it as "a feeble attempt at reviving a legend", GamePros Scary Larry as "a poor addition to the Tetris library", and Stephen Fulljames of Sega Saturn Magazine as "certainly nothing to get excited about." The four reviewers of Electronic Gaming Monthly were more positive than most, with Dan Hsu deeming it "a good package for even a part-time Tetris fan" and Sushi-X "a rewarding title with multiple levels of fun with the same classic challenge." The Puzzle Mode was met with disapproval for various reasons: Criscuola said it was too easy, Fulljames said it was frustratingly hard, Scary Larry said it didn't differ enough from the original Tetris, and a Next Generation critic said it simply wasn't as appealing as the original. Other frequent criticisms were that the graphics are subpar, and that the controls in all the modes are more difficult and counterintuitive than in previous versions of Tetris.

In a retrospective review, Allgame editor Jon Thompson called the Saturn version "boring".

Sequel
 is an arcade game released by Jaleco in 1997. It was the only sequel to Tetris Plus.

References

External links

1996 video games
Arcade video games
Blue Planet Software games
Game Boy games
Jaleco games
Mesoamerica in fiction
PlayStation (console) games
Sega Saturn games
Tetris
Video games developed in Japan
Video games scored by Iku Mizutani
Video games set in Cambodia
Video games set in Egypt
Video games set in Greece
Video games set in Mexico
Multiplayer and single-player video games